King's Highway 44, commonly referred to as Highway 44, was a provincially maintained highway in the Canadian province of Ontario. The -long route began at Highway 15 in the town of Almonte and travelled eastward through Lanark County towards Ottawa, ending at Highway 17. Highway 44 was assumed by the province in 1938 along existing unimproved roadway. A significant portion of the highway was incorporated into a new routing of Highway 17 in 1966. The highway alignment remained generally unchanged for the next three decades until it was decommissioned in 1997 and transferred to Lanark County and what is now the City of Ottawa. The road has since been redesignated as Lanark County Road 49 and Ottawa Road 49.

Route description 
Within Almonte, the road was known as Ottawa Street and Main Street; east of there it became March Road.
Today, the route is known as Lanark County Road 49 and Ottawa Road 49.

At the time of its decommissioning, Highway 44 began at a junction with Highway 15 (Christian Street) on the west side of Almonte. It crossed the Mississippi River, where it became Main Street and passed through the central portion of the town. In the eastern edge of Almonte, it was known Ottawa Street until Appleton Sideroad, where it became March Road and continued eastward in a straight line through farmland in the Ottawa Valley. It also passed through several forests as well as south of Greensmere Golf and Country Club before meeting what was then Highway 17 at an intersection but is now an interchange with Highway 417 (Exit 155).

History 
Highway 44 was established by the Department of Highways, predecessor to the Ministry of Transportation, on April  13, 1938,
by assuming ownership of existing county road between Almonte and Carp. When Highway 44 was assumed, the highway between Carleton Place and Arnprior was known as Highway 29. From the junction of these two highways, the route was paved eastward into Almonte already, but remained a gravel road elsewhere.
On November 9, 1965, the new Carp Bypass – a portion of Highway 17 designed to replace the old meandering route (now known as Donald B. Munro Drive) through Carp, Marathon and Antrim  – opened.
Highway 44 remained generally unchanged until March 31, 1997, when the entire route was decommissioned and transferred to Lanark County and the Regional Municipality of Ottawa–Carleton, which later became the City of Ottawa.
It has since been known as Lanark County Road 49 and Ottawa Road 49.

Major intersections

References 

044